is a train station in Kita-ku, Niigata, Niigata Prefecture, Japan, operated by East Japan Railway Company (JR East).

Lines
Hayadōri Station is served by the Hakushin Line, and is 11.5 kilometers from the starting point of the line at Niigata Station.

Layout
The station consists of two ground-level opposed side platforms, serving two tracks. There is a footbridge outside the gate.

Platforms

History
The station opened on 11 February 1957. It was rebuilt on 1 October 1970 on a location 200 meters further from Niizaki Station. With the privatization of Japanese National Railways (JNR) on 1 April 1987, the station came under the control of JR East.

Passenger statistics
In fiscal 2017, the station was used by an average of 1092 passengers daily (boarding passengers only).

Surrounding area
 Hayadōri Middle School

See also
 List of railway stations in Japan

References

External links

 JR East station information 

Railway stations in Niigata (city)
Hakushin Line
Railway stations in Japan opened in 1957
Stations of East Japan Railway Company